George Hunt (July 6, 1933 – December 4, 2020) was a Southern American artist, best known for his portraits of Blues musicians and illustrations for Blues Festivals, which ended up in many private collections in addition to galleries, museums, and the walls of Memphis businesses. He was primarily a painter, though he added collage highlights to some of his acrylic paintings that gave a distinctive three dimensionality and texture to the works. For 28 years, Hunt created the official poster for the Memphis in May Beale Street Music Festival. Many people have seen his work or might even own it on a poster or T-shirt without knowing his name. He was selected to be the "official artist" of 2003's "Year of the Blues," a congressionally endorsed effort to increase appreciation of the Blues as one of America's great contributions to international arts culture, and toured to many places promoting the celebration.

Hunt's work reflected his life experience growing up in the American South, including themes of African American life and the Civil Rights movement. His 1997 depiction of the Little Rock Nine, the nine brave students who desegregated Little Rock Central High School, was made into a U.S. postage stamp in 2005.

Early life
George Robert Hunt was born near Lake Charles, Louisiana. He spent much of his childhood in Hot Springs, Arkansas, and played football at the University of Arkansas at Pine Bluff, while studying art. His favorite artist from an early age was Pablo Picasso, but his life experiences would also inform his work, which includes themes of the Civil Rights Movement and African American Southern life and culture.

One such experience was in 1968, when Hunt was one of the pallbearers who carried the Reverend Doctor Martin Luther King Jr.'s body to the plane for its return to Georgia after his assassination.

Hunt taught art and coached sports at George Washington Carver High School in Memphis for three decades before he became a full time artist later in life.

Career as an artist

Hunt went to the University of Memphis to pursue his studies in art further through post-graduate work. He also studied at New York University. His works have cubist and abstract expressionist qualities, but also identifiably depict historical figures and events. His paintings generally feature bright colors and bold strokes of acrylic paint, with some relief effects via collage-style multi-media additions.

Willis Drinkard, proprietor of Gestine’s Gallery at 156 Beale St., provided managerial support for Hunt from 1989 to 2004. In 1992, Drinkard, Hunt, and David Simmons encouraged the Memphis In May Beale Street Music Festival to create a commemorative poster. From then on, Hunt's popularity soared.

In 1993, Hunt painted a piece titled "I Am A Man" as a tribute to the 1968 sanitation worker’s strike in Memphis, TN. The work now hangs in the National Museum of Civil Rights. No. 2 in the "I am a Man" series is part of the Melvin Holmes Collection of African American Art, in San Francisco.

Hunt and Drinkard had great success showing his work at the New York Art Expo in 1995, 1996, 1997 and 1998.

Hunt was commissioned to paint something for the Little Rock Central High School National historic site. His “America Cares/Little Rock Nine,” created in 1997, became a U.S. Postage Stamp in 2005 as part of a set called “To Form A More Perfect Union.” 

In 1998, he was selected to be the featured artist for the Rock & Roll Hall of Fame Museum’s American Music Master’s annual conference.

In 1998, Hunt painted a "Blues Greats" portrait gallery for the Horseshoe Tunica casino. The 26 paintings in that collection are now permanently on display in an exhibit titled "Mississippi Bluesmen" at the Gateway to the Blues Museum in Tunica, Mississippi.

In 2002, the U.S. Congress declared 2003 the "Year of the Blues." Hunt was designated the Official Artist for the celebration and he created a new set of pieces for a national tour. The exhibit of 26 paintings was called "Conjurating the Blues, The High Cotton Tour." It depicted the history of blues music in America. The title painting hung in the Radio City Music Hall in New York during the opening show. Hunt was featured in many segments of the 13-part "Year of the Blues" PBS radio series, produced by the Experience Music Project, telling stories of his experience with blues music. Later in 2003, the Blues Foundation recognized his contribution with a "Keeping the Blues Alive" award.

In 2005, Hunt was selected as the artist for the New Orleans Jazz & Heritage Festival Congo Square poster. During the festival his work was exhibited at the Stella Jones Gallery and the Ogden Museum of Southern Art.

His vivid body of portraiture includes depictions of Sonny Boy Williamson, Furry Lewis, Howlin' Wolf, Blind Lemon Jefferson and other legendary Blues musicians.

Awards
 2003 "Keeping the Blues Alive" award from the Blues Foundation.

Legacy
In 2005, Hunt's 1997 painting "America Cares/the Little Rock Nine" was selected for a set of U.S. Postal Service stamps commemorating milestones in the Civil Rights Movement. The image depicts the nine students who became the first African Americans to attend Central High School in Little Rock, Arkansas in 1957 after the Supreme Court declared segregated schools unconstitutional in Brown v. Board of Education. The painting was originally commissioned for the interpretive center at the Little Rock Central High School National Historic Site. Then President Clinton and his first lady asked to hang it in the White House while the interpretation Center was under construction; it remained in the White House for five years until its permanent installation back in Little Rock. The painting in the case as it hangs on the wall is 54.5" tall by 66" wide.

Works of art
Best known works beyond blues musician portraits and many posters for Blues festivals and the Memphis in May Beale Street Music Festival.

 Blues Man (painting)
 Dancin Blues (painting)
 I am a Man (series)
 America Cares/Little Rock Nine (painting, 1997)

Selected collections
 Gateway to the Blues Museum, Tunica, Mississippi
 October Gallery of Cheyney University, Cheyney, Pennsylvania
 The Melvin Holmes Collection of African American Art, San Francisco, California
 Rock & Roll Hall of Fame, Cleveland, Ohio
 The Museum of Pop Culture, Seattle, Washington

See also
African-American art
Cubism
List of artworks on stamps of the United States

References
Notes

Sources

External links
 George Hunt Official Website

1933 births
2020 deaths
African-American painters
20th-century American painters
21st-century American painters
American male painters
American collage artists
Modern painters
20th-century American printmakers
University of Arkansas alumni
University of Memphis alumni
New York University alumni
Painters from Louisiana
20th-century American male artists